Steven Loic Lecefel (born 16 April 1986 in Trappes, France) is a Martinican international footballer who currently plays as a forward for Team Wellington in the ISPS Handa Premiership.

Career

First years 
During his youth, Steven Lecefel played for the Guyancourt in Yvelines, France. He then played for two years with La Garenne-Colombes in the French seventh tier.

Club play 
In 2011, Lecefel left Paris for Barnet in London, who play in the English League Two, but he only stayed a few months after Lawrie Sanchez decided not to sign him. Lecefel then went to Hyde United where he was spotted by Rhyl FC manager Greg Strong signing for the club following their relegation to the second tier of the Welsh football league due to financial problems. With Rhyl, Lecefel helped the team earn promotion back to the Welsh Premier League, and got called up to the Martinique national football team.

International play 
In December 2012, Lecefel was called up to play for the Martinique national football team, being eligible through his father's ancestry. Lecefel played in the Caribbean Cup and helped the team qualify for the CONCACAF Gold Cup. He played five games and scored two goals.

References

External links

People from Trappes
Rhyl F.C. players
1986 births
Living people
French people of Martiniquais descent
Association football forwards
New Zealand Football Championship players
Martinique international footballers
Martiniquais footballers
Martiniquais expatriate footballers
Expatriate association footballers in New Zealand
Expatriate footballers in England
French expatriate sportspeople in New Zealand
French expatriate sportspeople in England
Martiniquais expatriate sportspeople in New Zealand
Martiniquais expatriate sportspeople in England